The Botero Museum also known as Museo Botero is a museum located in Bogotá, Colombia. It houses one of Latin America's most important international art collections. It sees over 500,000 visitors annually, and of those 2,000 students per month. Being in  La Candelaria neighborhood of Bogotá, the museum is in close proximity to other important landmarks like the Luis Ángel Arango Library and the Gold Museum of Bogotá.

History

Since the late 1960s, Colombian artist Fernando Botero had been a noted art collector. Initially of pre-Columbian pieces, later of colonial art and more recently of drawing, painting and universal modern sculpture. Until 1999, all of his collections were scattered throughout his properties in New York, Paris, Monte Carlo and Pietrasanta, as well as in a Swiss bank deposit in Bogotá.

Since the mid-1990s, Botero had raised the possibility of donating his entire art collection to the Museum of Antioquia in Medellín. However, the slowness in making decisions by the Antioquia authorities led him to accept the proposal of the then mayor of Bogotá, Enrique Peñalosa, to donate his collection to Bogotá.

In the year of 2000, the Colombian artist Fernando Botero donated 208 art pieces, 123 of his own making and 85 of other international artists, to the Bank of the Republic.  The museum is administered by Banrepcultural. With this collection, the Botero Museum was founded in the neighborhood of La Candelaria, the historic center of Bogotá, in a colonial mansion that was acquired by the Bank of the Republic and made suitable to house the art collection by Fernando Botero himself. Since November 1, 2000, the museum has been open to the public free of charge.

In the same year, Botero's collection arrived in Colombia after an exhibition at the Fundación Santander Central Hispano in Madrid (Spain). After donating these works to Bogotá, at the request of the Antioquia authorities, the artist also decided to donate a significant set of pieces of his authorship to the Museum of Antioquia, in addition to a set of sculptures for the Botero Plaza (in front of said Museum), in Medellin. Although most of the collection of international artists had been donated by Botero to Bogotá, he decided to put together a new set of about 21 pieces (Matta, Lam, Stella, Rodin, among others), to donate to the Museum of Antioquia.

Collection
The museum consists 123 works of Fernando Botero and 85 of other artists for a total of 208 works of art. Highlights of the permanent collection include works by Balthus, Georges Braque, Marc Chagall, Salvador Dalí, Joan Miró, Pablo Picasso, Sonia Delaunay, Claude Monet, and Henri Matisse.

The collection of works made by Fernando Botero
The collection of works by Fernando Botero includes numerous oil paintings, drawings, pastels, sanguines and sculptures made by him, especially during the most recent decades. His earliest production (in the 1940s, 1950s and 1960s) is not represented in this museum. Works from his initial artistic periods can be found in the permanent exhibition of the Colombian National Museum, also in Bogotá.

The collection includes a Boterian version of Leonardo da Vinci's Mona Lisa and a part of the first series on violence in Colombia (Pablo Escobar, Tirofijo, Carrobomba, La massacre de Mejor Esquina, etc.), among others. The latest series on violence in Colombia is part of the collection of the National Museum of Colombia.

Likewise, on the second floor of the museum there is a room dedicated to small and medium-sized sculptures, made of bronze and marble.

The Botero Museum in the Latin American context

The Botero Museum's modern art collection is valuable in Latin America. Along with the National Museum of Fine Arts of Buenos Aires, the São Paulo Museum of Art, the Caracas Museum of Contemporary Art and the Museum of Contemporary Art of the University of São Paulo, it constitutes, in its kind, one of the most important art collections in Latin America.

Gallery

See also
 Colombian National Museum
 Gold Museum
 Botero (surname)

References

External links 
 Museo Botero - Bank of the Republic of Colombia
Museo Botero within Google Arts & Culture

Museums in Bogotá
Art museums and galleries in Colombia